The Third  was a yakuza group based in Kumamoto, Kyushu, Japan. It was a secondary organization of the Kumamoto-rengo (熊本連合).

Founded by Yoshiaki Yamano in 1954 under the name , it changed its name to "Yamano-kai" in 1956. Masatoshi Minoda succeeded as its president in 1972, and Tetsuo Ikeda became the president in 1986.

The group dissolved in April 2001.  However, many of its members  formed a new group, the Sanshin-kai, in September of that year.  

The Yamano-kai was designated by the Japanese police as a bōryokudan group from December 1992 to November 2001.

Successive presidents
1st: Yoshiaki Yamano (山野 義明)
2nd: Masatoshi Minoda (蓑田 正敏)
3rd: Tetsuo Ikeda (池田 鉄雄)

References

Organizations established in 1954
1954 establishments in Japan
Organizations disestablished in 2001
2001 disestablishments in Japan
Yakuza groups based in Kyushu